The children of Muhammad include the three sons and four daughters of the Islamic prophet Muhammad. The common view is that all were born to Muhammad's first wife Khadija bint Khuwaylid, except one son, named Ibrahim, who was born to Maria al-Qibtiyya. Most Shia Muslims, however, hold that Fatima was the only biological daughter of Muhammad. Muhammad also had a foster son, Zayd ibn Harithah.

Sunni view 
In chronological order, most Sunni sources list Muhammad's children as
Qasim (598 – 601)
Zainab (599 – 629)
Ruqayyah (601 – 624)
Umm Kulthum (603 – 630)
Fatima (605 – 632)
Abd Allah (611 – 615)
Ibrahim (630 – 632)

Shia view
A number of Shia sources argue that Zainab, Ruqayyah, and Umm Kulthum were adopted by Muhammad after the death of their mother, Hala, a sister of Khadija. According to Abbas, most Shia Muslims hold that Fatima was Muhammad's only biological daughter, whereas Fedele limits this belief to Twelver Shi'ism. Hyder reports that this belief is prevalent among the Shias of South Asia.

Descendants
Muhammad's sons all died in childhood. Their early deaths, according to Freedman and McClymond, was detrimental to a hereditary-based system of succession to Muhammad. Alternatively, after the past prophets, writes Madelung, their descendants became the spiritual and material heirs to them in the Quran, a matter that is settled therein by divine selection and not by the faithful.  

Muhammad's daughters reached adulthood but they all died relatively young. Fatima married Ali ibn Abi Talib, Ruqayyah and Umm Kulthum married Uthman one after another, and Zainab married Abu al-As ibn al-Rabi. Umm Kulthum remained childless whereas Ruqayya gave birth to a boy Abd Allah, who died at the age of six. Zaynab gave birth to a son Ali and a daughter Umama, whom Ali ibn Abi Talib married after Fatima's death. Fatima gave birth to two boys, Hasan and Husayn, and it is through her that Muhammad's progeny has spread throughout the Muslim world.

Parenting 
Muhammad's attitude and treatment towards his children, enshrined in hadith literature, is viewed by Muslims as an exemplar to be imitated. However, critics have noted favoritism towards his daughter Fatima in refusing her husband Ali’s pursuit of a second wife, despite the Islamic legality of  polygyny. While there is evidence that Fatima was the favorite daughter, Sunni traditions that place Ali in a negative light should be treated with caution as they mirror the political agenda of the time, according to Buehler. In this case, it appears that the three versions of this tradition can all be traced back to al-Miswar ibn Makhrama, a companion who was nine when Muhammad died. Reflecting the Shia view, Abbas praises the couple for their love and loyalty.

See also
Muhammad's wives
Companions of the Prophet
Islam and children
Sayyid

References

Bibliography

Further reading

 
Quraysh
Banu Hashim
6th-century Arabs
7th-century Arabs
People from Mecca
Medina